ATIC may refer to:

 ATIC Records
 Air Technical Intelligence Center,  a former incarnation  (1951-1961) of the current American National Air and Space Intelligence Center 
 ATIC, a gene which codes inosine monophosphate synthase
 Advanced Thin Ionization Calorimeter, a balloon-borne experiment to detect cosmic rays
 Advanced Technical Intelligence Center, an educational institution focusing on technical intelligence
 Atic Atac, a video game for the ZX Spectrum
 Advanced Technology Investment Company, an investment company from Abu Dhabi, owned by Mubadala Development Company
 Australian Transformation and Innovation Centre, a computer laboratory run by Thales Australia

See also 
Attic (disambiguation)